There are two places named Loppersum:
 Loppersum, Netherlands, a place and municipality in the province of Groningen, Netherlands
 Loppersum, Hinte, a place in the municipality of Hinte, East Frisia, Germany